The People's Movement for the Liberation of Angola (abbr. MPLA), for some years called the People's Movement for the Liberation of Angola – Labour Party, is an Angolan left-wing, social democratic political party. The MPLA fought against the Portuguese army in the Angolan War of Independence from 1961 to 1974, and defeated the National Union for the Total Independence of Angola (UNITA) and the National Liberation Front of Angola (FNLA) in the Angolan Civil War. The party has ruled Angola since the country's independence from Portugal in 1975, being the de facto government throughout the civil war and continuing to rule afterwards.

Formation
On 10 December 1956, in Estado Novo-ruled Portuguese Angola, the underground Angolan Communist Party (PCA) merged with the Party of the United Struggle for Africans in Angola (PLUA) to form the People's Movement for the Liberation of Angola, with Viriato da Cruz, the president of the PCA, as secretary general. Other groups later merged into MPLA, such as Movement for the National Independence of Angola (MINA) and the Democratic Front for the Liberation of Angola (FDLA).

The MPLA's core base includes the Ambundu ethnic group and the educated intelligentsia of the capital city, Luanda. The party formerly had links to European and Soviet communist parties, but is currently a full-member of the Socialist International grouping of social democratic parties. The armed wing of MPLA was the People's Armed Forces for the Liberation of Angola (FAPLA). The FAPLA later became the national armed forces of the country.

In 1961, the MPLA joined the African Party for the Independence of Guinea and Cape Verde (PAIGC), its fraternal party in Guinea-Bissau and Cabo Verde, in direct combat against the Portuguese empire in Africa. The following year, the expanded umbrella group Conference of Nationalist Organizations of the Portuguese Colonies (CONCP) replaced FRAIN, adding FRELIMO of Mozambique and the CLSTP, forerunner of the Movement for the Liberation of São Tomé and Príncipe (MLSTP).

In the early 1970s, the MPLA's guerrilla activities were more and more reduced, due to the counter-insurgency campaigns of the Portuguese military. At the same time, internal conflicts caused the movement to temporarily split up into three factions (Ala Presicencialista, Revolta Activa and Revolta do Leste) – a situation which was overcome in 1974/75, but scarred the party.

Independence and civil war
The Carnation Revolution in Lisbon, Portugal in 1974 established a military government that promptly ceased anti-independence fighting in Angola and agreed to hand over power to a coalition of three pro-independence Angolan movements. The coalition quickly broke down and the newly independent Angola broke into a state of civil war. Maintaining control over Luanda and the lucrative oil fields of the Atlantic coastline, Agostinho Neto, the leader of the MPLA, declared the independence of the Portuguese Overseas Province of Angola as the People's Republic of Angola on 11 November 1975 in accordance with the Alvor Accords. UNITA and FNLA together declared Angolan independence in Huambo. These differences reignited civil war between UNITA & FNLA and the MPLA, with the latter winning the upper hand. Agostinho Neto became the first president upon independence, and he was succeeded after his death by José Eduardo dos Santos in 1979.

In 1974–1976, South Africa and Zaire intervened militarily in favor of FNLA and UNITA, and the United States heavily aided the two groups. Cuba in turn intervened in 1975 to aid the MPLA against South African intervention, with the Soviet Union aiding both Cuba and the MPLA government during the war. In November 1980, the MPLA had all but pushed UNITA into the bush, and the South African forces withdrew. The United States Congress barred further U.S. military involvement in the country against the wishes of President Ronald Reagan, fearing situation similar to the Vietnam War. In 1976 the FNLA withdrew its troops to their bases in Zaire, while part of them joined the 32 Battalion formed by South Africa in order to receive anti-MPLA Angolans.

At its first congress in 1977, the MPLA adopted Marxism–Leninism as the party ideology and added Partido do Trabalho (Labour Party) to its name.

After Nito Alves's attempted coup in 1977, Neto ordered the killing of suspected followers and sympathisers of "orthodox communism" inside and outside the party. During the coup, Cuban forces stationed in Angola sided with the MPLA leadership against the coup organizers. Estimates for the number of Alves' followers killed by Cuban and MPLA troops in the aftermath range from 2,000 — 70,000 dead, with some placing the death toll at 18,000. After the violent internal conflict called Fractionism, it made it clear that it would follow the socialist, not the communist, model. However, it maintained close ties with the Soviet Union and the Communist bloc, establishing socialist economic policies and a one-party state. Several thousand Cuban troops remained in the country to combat UNITA fighters and bolster the regime's security.

When the Cold War ended, the MPLA abandoned its Marxist–Leninist ideology and declared social democracy to be its official ideology on its third congress in December 1991.

The MPLA emerged victorious in Angola's 1992 general election, but eight opposition parties rejected the election as rigged. UNITA sent negotiators to the Luanda, where they were killed. As a consequence, hostilities erupted in the city, and immediately spread to other parts of the country. Tens of thousands of UNITA and FNLA sympathizers were subsequently killed nationwide by MPLA forces, in what is known as the Halloween Massacre, and the civil war resumed. The war continued until 2002, when UNITA leader Jonas Savimbi was killed. The two parties promptly agreed to a ceasefire, and a plan was laid out for UNITA to demobilize and become a political party. Over 500,000 civilians were killed during the civil war. Human rights observers have accused the MPLA of "genocidal atrocities," "systematic extermination," "war crimes" and "crimes against humanity during the civil war." Political scientist Rudolph Rummel estimated that the MPLA were responsible for between 100,000 and 200,000 deaths in democide from 1975 to 1987.

Human rights record
The MPLA government of Angola has been accused of human rights violations such as arbitrary arrest and detention and torture by international organisations, including Amnesty International and Human Rights Watch. In response, the MPLA government hired Samuels International Associates Inc in 2008 to help improve Angola's global image.

Party organizations
At present, major mass organizations of the MPLA-PT include the Angolan Women's Organization (Organização da Mulher Angolana), National Union of Angolan Workers (União Nacional dos Trabalhadores Angolanos), Agostinho Neto Pioneer Organization (Organização de Pioneiros de Agostinho Neto), and the Youth of MPLA (Juventude do MPLA).

Foreign support
During both the Portuguese Colonial War and the Angolan Civil War, the MPLA received military and humanitarian support primarily from the governments of Algeria, the Bulgarian People's Republic, East Germany, Cape Verde Islands, Czechoslovak Socialist Republic, the Congo, Cuba, Guinea-Bissau, Morocco, the Mozambican People's Republic, Nigeria, North Korea, the Polish People's Republic, China, the Romanian Socialist Republic, São Tomé and Príncipe, Somalia, the Soviet Union, Sudan, Tanzania, Libya and SFR Yugoslavia. While China did briefly support the MPLA, it also actively supported the MPLA's enemies, the FNLA and later UNITA, during the war for independence and the civil war. The switch was the result of tensions between China and the Soviet Union for dominance of the communist bloc, which almost led to war.

Electoral history 
In the 1992 election, MPLA-PT won 53.74% of the votes and 129 out of 227 seats in parliament; however, eight opposition parties rejected the 1992 elections as rigged. In the next election, delayed until 2008 due to the civil war, the MPLA won 81.64% of the vote and 191 out of 220 parliamentary seats. In the 2012 legislative election, the party won 71.84% of the vote and 175 of 220 parliamentary seats.

Presidential elections

National Assembly elections

In popular culture 
 In 1976, reggae singer Tapper Zukie dedicated the song and album titled "M.P.L.A" to the movement.
 Pablo Moses dedicated the song "We Should be in Angola" (which appeared on his album Revolutionary Dream) to the MPLA.
 The Sex Pistols singer John Lydon referred to the MPLA in the lyrics of "Anarchy in the U.K.".
 The reggae band The Revolutionaries devoted an extended dub mix record to the movement entitled "MPLA", recorded at Channel One, engineered by King Tubby and released on the "Well Charge" label. The bass line and rhythm was based on "Freedom Blues" by Little Richard. The Revolutionaries also released an extended discomix entitled "Angola". Both tracks were later released on the Revolutionary Sounds album featuring Sly and Robbie.
 The video game Call of Duty: Black Ops 2 features a level in which the player fought alongside the UNITA and Jonas Savimbi against the MPLA.
 The video game Metal Gear Solid V: The Phantom Pain sets Missions 13-29 within the environs of the Angola-Zaire border region. Several references to the MPLA, CFA, and UNITA are made--with the in-universe mercenary group Diamond Dogs (led by player character Venom Snake) clashing with or aiding them in different missions.

See also
 African independence movements
 Cuban intervention in Angola
 History of Angola
 List of current Angolan ministers (all MPLA members)
 Mário Pinto de Andrade
 Luzia Inglês Van-Dúnem

References

Further reading
 David Birmingham, A Short History of Modern Angola, Hurst 2015.
 Inge Brinkmann, War, Witches and Traitors: Cases from the MPLA's Eastern Front in Angola (1966–1975), Journal of African History, 44, 2003, pp. 303–325
 Mario Albano, Angola: una rivoluzione in marcia, Jaca Book, Milano, 1972
 Lúcio Lara, Um amplo movimento: Itinerário do MPLA através de documentos e anotações, vol. I, Até Fevereiro de 1961, 2ª ed., Luanda: Lúcio & Ruth Lara, 1998, vol. II, 1961–1962, Luanda: Lúcio Lara, 2006, vol. III, 1963–1964, Luanda: Lúcio Lara, 2008

External links
  
 MPLA campaign site

MPLA
Collaborators with the Soviet Union
Communist parties in Angola
Consultative member parties of the Socialist International
Democratic socialist parties
Formerly ruling communist parties
Left-wing nationalist parties
Left-wing parties
National liberation movements
Parties of one-party systems
Political parties established in 1956
Separatism in Angola
Separatism in Portugal
Social democratic parties in Angola